Kathy, Kathie, Cathy or Cathie Smith may refer to:
Cathy Smith (born 1948), Canadian convicted of involuntary manslaughter in the death of John Belushi
Cathy Smith (cricketer) (born 1961), Australian cricketer
Kathy Smith (fitness personality) (born 1951), personal trainer
Kathy Smith (filmmaker) (born 1963), Australian independent filmmaker
Kathy Smith (Australian politician) (?–2017), Australian politician in the New South Wales Legislative Assembly
Kathy Smith (American politician), member of the Fairfax County Board of Supervisors 
Kathy Smith, Californian singer-songwriter who performed at the Isle of Wight Festival 1970

See also
Cathy Gilliat-Smith (born 1981), English field hockey player
Kate Smith (disambiguation)
Katherine Smith (disambiguation)
Kathleen Smith (disambiguation)
Katie Smith (born 1974), basketball player